Royce Manoj Kumar Victor  is a bishop in the Church of South India: he has served as Bishop of Malabar since 2016.

 

21st-century Anglican bishops in India
Indian bishops
Indian Christian religious leaders
Anglican bishops of Malabar
Living people
Year of birth missing (living people)